State Route 46 (SR 46) is a  state highway that travels west-to-east through portions of Dodge, Laurens, Wheeler, Treutlen, Emanuel, Candler, and Bulloch counties in the central part of the U.S. state of Georgia. The highway connects the Eastman area with the south-central part of Bulloch County. The highway closely parallels Interstate 16 (I-16) and serves local traffic.

Route description
SR 46 begins at an intersection with US 341/SR 27 (Hawkinsville Highway), just west of Eastman, in Dodge County. This intersection also marks the northern terminus of US 341 Bus. and SR 27 Bus. At Ogden Street, they head southeast for a short while, then turn left on 5th Avenue. About  later, they intersect US 23/SR 87/SR 117 (Oak Street). Here, US 341 Bus./SR 27 Bus. depart to the southeast, while SR 117 travels concurrent with SR 46 for a few blocks. At Main Street, the two highways diverge. Page Street is the southern terminus of SR 46 Conn. SR 46 heads east-northeast, out of the city, passing Heart of Georgia Regional Airport. The highway travels through rural areas of the county and meets the northern terminus of SR 165 (Chauncey–Dublin Highway), before entering Laurens County. It continues to the northeast and intersects SR 126. The two highways head concurrently to the northeast past an intersection with US 319/US 441/SR 31, and then curve to the east-southeast. Less than  later, SR 126 splits off to the southeast. SR 46 travels through rural areas of the county, cuts across a corner of Wheeler County and another corner of Laurens County, before re-entering Wheeler County. The highway curves to the northeast and intersects SR 19. Then, it crosses over the Oconee River into Treutlen County. A few miles later is an intersection with SR 199. In Soperton, it intersects SR 29 (West Main Street). Two blocks later is an intersection with SR 15/SR 78 (West Louisiana Avenue). After that, it curves to the east-northeast and intersects US 221/SR 56. Just before leaving town, SR 46 curves to the southeast. It passes the Treutlen County Airport. A few miles later, it meets the southern terminus of SR 227. The highway curves to the northeast and meets the western terminus of SR 298. The highway passes by Wildwood Lake and intersects SR 86, just before leaving the county. SR 46/SR 86 travel concurrently to the southeast and intersect SR 297 on the Treutlen–Emanuel county line. Just before entering Oak Park, the two highways curve to the east-northeast. In the city, they intersect US 1/SR 4 (Harrington Street). At this intersection, SR 86 follows US 1/SR 4 south into the main part of the city, while SR 46 follows US 1/SR 4 north through the northern parts of the city. They cross over the Ohoopee River and have an interchange with I-16 before SR 46 splits off and begins to parallel the interstate for the rest of its length. SR 46 leaves Oak Park and travels through rural areas of the county before entering Candler County. The highway travels through mostly rural areas for the rest of its length, with few exceptions. After an intersection with SR 57, it curves to the east-northeast and enters Metter. At College Street, SR 23 begins a concurrency for a few blocks. At Lewis Street is an intersection with SR 121. Here, SR 23 splits off to the south. One block later is the northern terminus of SR 129 (South Leroy Street). After the highway leaves Metter, it travels through Pulaski before entering Bulloch County. SR 46 travels through Register and intersects US 25/US 301/SR 73 less than  later. It passes Hickman Pond and crosses through a portion of Eagle Creek Golf Course, which is just northeast of Kennedy Pond. The highway curves back to the southeast, resuming its close proximity to I-16. It reaches an intersection with SR 67, south-southeast of the unincorporated community of Denmark, and turns south to run concurrent with SR 67. A little over one mile later, the two highways cross over I-16 (exit 127), where SR 46 meets its eastern terminus as SR 67 continues to Pembroke.

The only portion of SR 46 that is part of the National Highway System, a system of routes determined to be the most important for the nation's economy, mobility, and defense, is the concurrency with US 1/SR 4 in Oak Park.

History

At one point, SR 46 used to continue to US 80, just west of Blitchton in Bryan County. That portion was decommissioned and currently serves as a county road.

Major intersections

Eastman connector route

State Route 46 Connector (SR 46 Conn.) is a  connector route that exists entirely within the central part of Dodge County. The route is completely inside the main part of the city limits of Eastman, and is known as Page Street for its entire length. It is an unsigned highway.

It begins at an intersection with the SR 46 mainline (5th Avenue), just northeast of the downtown part of Eastman. The highway heads northeast for one block until it meets its northern terminus, an intersection with SR 117 (Anson Avenue).

SR 46 Conn. is not part of the National Highway System, a system of roadways important to the nation's economy, defense, and mobility.

See also

References

External links

 
 Georgia Roads (Routes 41 - 60)

046
Transportation in Dodge County, Georgia
Transportation in Laurens County, Georgia
Transportation in Wheeler County, Georgia
Transportation in Treutlen County, Georgia
Transportation in Emanuel County, Georgia
Transportation in Candler County, Georgia
Transportation in Bulloch County, Georgia